Tropidacris collaris is a species of grasshopper in the family Romaleidae. A large South American grasshopper, it is also known as the blue-winged grasshopper although they vary greatly in coloration. It is common in both forests and dry areas of South America from Colombia to Argentina. In parts of northern Argentina, they are considered a pest. They are also popular among insect and terrarium enthusiasts.

A grasshopper of this species was spotted landing on the arm of James Rodríguez, after he scored a goal during Colombia's 2–1 defeat to Brazil, at the quarter-finals of the 2014 FIFA World Cup.

References

External links
 Orthoptera Species File

Romaleidae